Ajagbo was an Alaafin of the West African Oyo Empire, whose long reign took place during the seventeenth century.

Ajagbo succeeded his grandfather Obalokun as Alaafin. According to legend, he reigned for 140 years. He was reportedly a twin.

He was notable for introducing the title of Are ona Kakanfo (a role comparable to that of field marshal) in Oyo. He was also known by Oyo neighbours as a warlike king who sent armies to destroy towns in the Popo country, Ile Olopa and his maternal town Ikereku-were.

He was succeeded by his son Odarawu.

References

Samuel Johnson, Obadiah Johnson. The History of the Yorubas, From the Earliest of Times to the Beginning of the British Protectorate. p 168

Alaafins of Oyo